Pityrodia scabra is a species of flowering plant in the mint family Lamiaceae and is endemic to inland Western Australia. It is a sticky shrub with linear leaves arranged in whorls, and groups of about 7 to 9 white flowers.

Description
The edges of the leaves are rolled under and more or less scalloped, the upper surface becoming rough with age. The four stamens extend slightly beyond the end of the petal tube.

Taxonomy and naming
Pityrodia scabra was first formally described in 1967 by Alex George from a specimen collected near Cowcowing, and the description was published in the Journal of the Royal Society of Western Australia. The specific epithet (scabra) means "scabrous" or "rough", referring to the surface of the leaves.

In 2012, Kelly Anne Shepherd described two subspecies of P. scabra in Australian Systematic Botany, and the names are accepted by the Australian Plant Census:
 Pityrodia scabra subsp. dendrotricha K.A.Sheph.
 Pityrodia scabra A.S.George subsp. scabra

Distribution
This pityrodia occurs in the Avon Wheatbelt, Coolgardie and Mallee bioregions of inland Western Australia.

Conservation
Pityrodia scabra is classified as "not threatened" by the Government of Western Australia Department of Biodiversity, Conservation and Attractions.

References

scabra
Plants described in 1967
Flora of Western Australia
Taxa named by Alex George